Nyŏngwŏn County is a county in South P'yŏngan province, North Korea.

Administrative divisions
Nyŏngwŏn county is divided into 1 ŭp (town), 1 tong (neighbourhood) and 23 ri (villages):

Counties of South Pyongan